The men's decathlon at the 2019 Asian Athletics Championships was held on 22 and 23 April.

Medalists

Results

100 metres
Wind: +0.8 m/s

Long jump

Shot put

High jump

400 metres

110 metres hurdles
Wind: +2.2 m/s

Discus throw

Pole vault

Javelin throw

1500 metres

Final standings

References

Decathlon
Combined events at the Asian Athletics Championships